Quetta, Pakistan features a continental semi-arid climate with a large variation between summer and winter temperatures.

Unlike most of Pakistan, however, Quetta does not have a monsoon of sustained, heavy rainfall. A lot of precipitation in winter is snow, falling mostly in December, January and February.

Monthly climate cycle
The monthly breakup of the weather in Quetta is as follows:

January
January is the coldest month in Quetta, and Western Disturbance causes rainfall with occasional snowfall in the city.

January is the most probable month for snow. Western disturbances are at the peak of their season, and the combination of wintriness makes this month most suitable for the season's heavy snow. All the decades of this month are crucial for the snow to fall. During the past years, the city have seen some record snowfalls during this month. On 14 and 15 January 2017 Quetta received heaviest snow of last 10 years with 2 feet of snow recorded in some areas.

February
The weather in February is somewhat similar to that of January: generally cold, with Western Disturbance causing rains and snowfall.

On 28 February 2011 heavy hailstorms lashed the valley followed by heavy rainfall.

The probability of falling snow in this month is high; every year the city receives light to moderate snow during the month mostly during the first two decades of the month; however, there are chances of snow even in the last decade of the month.

March
March is the wettest month of the city, and remains cool, but towards the end of the month becomes warmer. Western Disturbances continues to affect the weather, producing hailstorms and causing rains with strong winds, and the chances of snowfall on the mountains around the city, and occasional chances of snowfall in the city mostly during the first three decades of the month. The likelihood of thunderstorms is very high during the month, with the possibility of some incredible thunders in the city followed by heavy downpour.

On 8 March 2007 light snowfall occurred in the city.
A western wave entered Balochistan on 2 March 2019 which caused flash flooding in the province including Quetta the city which received 137 mm of rain along with snowfall recorded 4 cm.

April
Thunderstorms persist during the first decade of the month, and continue intermittently during the second and third decades. The weather in April is similar to the weather of March.

In April 2011, Quetta saw two major wet spells, the first one commenced from 7 to 12 April, while the second one started from 14 to 17 April intermittently. During the period, the city was battered by heavy rainfalls and thunderstorms. On 16 April, lightning killed one person and injured three persons near Pashtoon street in Brawrey. In April 2011, Quetta received  of rain, which is highest monthly rainfall in April since 2000.

May
In May, the weather becomes hotter. Humidity levels decline as compared to other months. On 2 May 2005, a storm covered the entire city with a blanket of dust that lasted for many days.

June
In June, temperatures continue to increase.

In 2007, Cyclone Yemyin hit the coastal areas of Balochistan, and caused rains in most parts of the province, including Quetta producing a record breaking  of rain between 22 June to 30.

On 27 June 2016 a cloudburst occurred in the afternoon. As a result of this cloudburst 50 mm (Quetta Samungli) rain fell in one and a half-hour with big size hail stones, while 8 mm was recorded at Quetta (Sheikh Manda).

July
July is the hottest month in Quetta. Since Quetta lies partially outside the belt of the monsoon, the effect thereof is seldom visible in the city. However, sometimes if monsoon gets strong enough, then Quetta can also have some rains.

On 14 July 2006 a severe dust storm hit the Quetta valley for three consecutive days, reducing visibility to less than a kilometer. Again on 23 July 2007, another dust storm enveloped the city and its surroundings, reducing visibility to less than a kilometer but also affected both air and vehicle traffic.

August
The heavy rainfall resulted in major flooding taking down with it multiple lives and their precious homes and livestock. On 6 August 2013 a severe rain storm with heavy downpour lash Quetta city, consequently at least two people died while several houses damaged in Nawan Kali area of the city, dozens of mud houses were destroyed in the rain while several trees and signboards were uprooted. Moreover, at least five people, including three kids, sustained injuries when roof of a house collapsed. City roads were submerged under rain water caused severe traffic jams. Meanwhile, 220 kV transmission line tripped due to heavy rain and storm, disrupting electricity to 17 districts of the province including Quetta. According to Pakistan Meteorological Department  of rainfall was recorded during one and half-hour rainfall.

September
In September, the weather remains hot, but gets cooler towards the last week of the month. It is one of the driest months in the city. On 8 September 2008, a dust storm covered the entire city, and lasted for many days.

In 2011, a spell of monsoon rains produced widespread heavy rains in Sindh and northeastern parts of Balochistan. On 3 September,  rain was recorded again on 5 September,  of rain was recorded.
In September 2011,  of rain was recorded.

October

November
Winter begins in November, as the Western Disturbance returns with rain and possibly snow over the mountains.

December
December is typically a chilly month. Western Disturbances begin to cause rain and snowfall.

December is the wettest month of the city during the winter season. The rainfall intensity gains strength during the last third of the month, but rainfall may occur earlier. There are fair chances of snowfall most probably during the last third. Light snowfall occurred on 9 December 2015 in Quetta.

The severe cold wave started on 28 November 2010 and continued till 17 January 2011. Pakistan Meteorological Department had forecasted in their Weather Advisory that during the coming period, mercury level may reach .

Cold front
Quetta is one of the coldest places in Balochistan and Pakistan. Every year during winter season temperatures reaches near , while temperatures below  are not uncommon. For many consecutive years, the city had experienced a temperature below  several times.

The Pakistan Meteorological Department's recording of severe cold weather since 1960 are recorded below:

Snowfall
Quetta usually receives snow in December, January, and February, though it is not unusual to have a snowfall as late as March. During the drought of 1998–2002, Quetta did not receive any snowfall; while in 2004, 2005, and 2008 it snowed only once in the year. In 2004 and 2008, the city received heavy snow twice after a hiatus of fifteen years.

On 31 December 2004 Quetta received more than one foot of snow for the first time in fifteen years, though in 2006, 2007 and 2009 the city did not get snow. On 29 January 2008, Quetta had four inches in four hours, a few days later, on 2 February 2008, Quetta received more than one foot of snow in just 10 hours. During the winter of 2010, there was no snowfall due to the El-Nino weather system over Pakistan.

The major snowfalls in Quetta since 2000 are:

 On 18 February 2003 Quetta received 6 inches of snowfall for the first time since the drought hit the province in 1998.
 On 29 January 2004 Quetta received heavy snowfall after a long period of five years.
 On 31 December 2004 Quetta received more than one foot of snowfall after fifteen years.
 On 29 January 2008 Quetta received more than four inches of snowfall in four hours.
 On 2 February 2008 Quetta received more than one foot of snow in just 10 hours.
 On 12 February 2009, Quetta received heavy snowfall.
 On 21 January 2012, Quetta received more than one 6 inches of snow till night.
 On 22 January 2012, Quetta received more than 8 inches of snow.
 On 24 January 2012, Quetta received more than 2 inches of snow.
 On 30 January 2012, Quetta received more than 2 inches of snow.
 On 17 February 2012, Quetta received more than 2 inches of snow.
 On 8 January 2014, Quetta received one foot of snow.
 On 14 January 2017 Quetta received 5 inches of snow
 On 15 January 2017 some areas of Quetta received 2 feet of snow from 4 am to 9 am.

Annual rainfall
The city mainly receives rain from the west during the winter season, from November till the end of March. In 2003, the city received light snowfall of 6 inches for the first time since the drought hit the province in 1998. In 2004 and 2005, Quetta received normal rains with snow falling two times in January 2004 and December 2004 and light snow in 2005. While in 2006 Quetta received almost normal rainfalls although above normal rains in July and August. In 2008 Quetta received normal rains with snow falling two times in January and February. In 2010 the city received below normal rains of just , the lowest since 2001.

The annual rainfall since 1982, based on data from Pakistan Meteorological Department:

Drought

Quetta was affected by a severe drought spell resulted from very low rainfall in the winter season of 1998. The La-Nina phenomena was responsible for below normal rains Balochistan including Quetta city from 1998, after diminishing in December 2000 it was reappeared, and lasted till March 2001 after that it faded gradually in the next few months. During the severe drought North Balochistan received about 30% less rain while South Balochistan received 50–60% less than normal rain.

At the peak of the drought in 2000, the city received just  of rainfall, while almost no rainfall or snowfall was observed in winter season. The drought enveloped the whole country and resulted in 30% below normal rains in Pakistan. At least 1.2 million people in Balochistan were affected by drought, and over 100 died, mostly because of dehydration, according to the government sources.

Pakistan Meteorological Departments in Quetta
 Regional Met. Centre, Quetta
 Geophysical Centre, Quetta

See also
 Climate of Pakistan
 Climate of Gwadar
 List of extreme weather records in Pakistan
 2011 Balochistan floods

References

External links
 Climate Data of Quetta
 Weather and Climate.com Quetta weather news

Quetta
Climate by city in Pakistan